Rodolfo Jorge Walsh (January 9, 1927 – March 25, 1977) was an Argentine writer and journalist of Irish descent, considered the founder of investigative journalism. He is most famous for his Open Letter from a Writer to the Military Junta, which he published the day before his murder, protesting that Argentina's last civil-military dictatorship's economic policies were having an even greater and disastrous effect on ordinary Argentines than its widespread human rights abuses.

Born in Lamarque, Walsh finished his primary education in a small town in Río Negro Province, from where he moved to Buenos Aires in 1941, where he completed high school. Although he started studying philosophy at university, he abandoned it and held a number of different jobs, mostly as a writer or editor. Between 1944 and 1945 he joined the Alianza Libertadora Nacionalista, a movement he later denounced as being "Nazi" in its roots. In 1953 he received the Buenos Aires Municipal Literature Award for his book Variaciones en Rojo.

Initially supporting the "Revolución Libertadora"'s coup which overthrew Juan Perón's democratic government in 1955, by 1956 Walsh already rejected the hard-line policies of the military government led by Aramburu. In 1957 he finished Operación Masacre ("Operation Massacre"), an investigative work on the illegal execution of Peron's sympathizers during an ill-fated attempt at restoring Peronism to power in June 1956. Operación Masacre is now considered by scholars as the first historical non-fiction novel, preceding Truman Capote's In Cold Blood.

In 1960 he went to Cuba, where together with Jorge Masetti Walsh founded the Prensa Latina press agency. It has been established that he decrypted a CIA telex referring to the upcoming Bay of Pigs invasion, helping Fidel Castro to prepare for the supposedly secret operation. Back in Argentina in 1961, by the late 1960s he had close ties to the CGT de los Argentinos. In 1973 Walsh joined the Montoneros guerrilla radical group, but eventually began to question the views of the organization, and so decided to fight the new dictatorship that arose in 1976 by the use of words instead of guns, then writing his famous . Shortly after, on March 25, 1977, he was mortally wounded during a shoot-out with a "task force" group that ambushed him on the street. Walsh's body and some of his writings were kidnapped and never seen again, and he is remembered as a desaparecido, as well as a victim of state-sponsored terrorism.

At least four films have been based on his work, including Operación masacre (1973) and Murdered at Distance ("Asesinato a distancia", 1998), and three of his books were published years after his death, most notably Cuento para tahúres y otros relatos policiales. Walsh's daughter, Patricia Walsh, is a politician.

Early years
Rodolfo Jorge Walsh (of Irish descent), was born in 1927 on a farm in the Lamarque locality of Río Negro Province, Argentina to third-generation Irish immigrants. For a long time there was confusion regarding Walsh's birthplace, due to the renaming of Colonia Nueva del Pueblo de Choele Choel to its current denomination of Lamarque, in 1942. This other Lamarque is a neighborhood of Choele Choel about nine miles away from Walsh's birthplace.

In 1941 he moved to Buenos Aires to attend secondary school. After graduation, he began studying philosophy, but then left school and took on a diverse range of jobs including office worker in a meat processing plant, labourer, dishwasher, antiques vendor, and window washer. Then at the age of 18 he began working as a proofreader at a newspaper, the humble beginnings of what would develop into a distinguished career in journalism, which continued until his assassination in 1977.

Journalism
In 1951 Walsh began to work in journalism proper, with the magazines Leoplán and Vea y Lea (See and Read). In 1953 he won the Buenos Aires Municipal Prize for Literature for his book of short stories Variations in Red (Variaciones en Rojo).

After meeting a survivor of the shootings of José León Suárez, Walsh produced a book about the event, in which he wrote "This is a story that I'm writing spontaneously and in the heat of the moment, so that they don't beat me to it, but that afterwards will crumple day by day in my pocket, because I'll go all over Buenos Aires and no one will want to publish it or even know about it." In 1957 he went to the office of Dr. Jorge Ramos Mejía and asked Dr. Marcelo Sánchez Sorondo, director of the weekly Azul y Blanco to help him publish the book.

With the financial backing of Mejía he was able that same year to produce Operation Massacre (Operación Masacre), with the subtitle "A process that has not been closed" from Ediciones Sigla, an investigative journalism piece that was later brought to the cinema.

His works are principally in the genres of Police and Crime, Journalism and Testimonial, with books that have been widely published like Who killed Rosendo (Quién mató a Rosendo).

Political activity
Between 1944 and 1945, Walsh was a member of The Nationalist Liberation Alliance (Alianza Libertadora Nacionalista), a group which years later he labelled as being a Nazi front.

Walsh was never an actual supporter of Peronism, but he became more sympathetic towards the group from October 1956, writing in that month's edition of Leoplán, "Here they closed their eyes", a tribute to the naval aviators who had died during the Revolución Libertadora.

In September 1958 he wrote: 

In 1959 he travelled to Cuba, where with his colleagues and compatriots Jorge Masetti, Rogelio García Lupo, and the Colombian writer Gabriel García Márquez, he founded the agency Prensa Latina. On returning to Argentina he worked at the magazines Primera Plana and Panorama. During the Onganía dictatorship he founded the weekly CGTA, which he directed between 1968 and 1970, and which after a raid and the detention of Raimundo Ongaro was published clandestinely. During 1972 he wrote for the weekly Semanario Villero and from 1973 in the daily Noticias with his friends Paco Urondo and Miguel Bonasso, among others.

Towards the middle of 1970, Walsh began to associate with the Peronismo de Base (Base Peronism) a political branch of the Fuerzas Armadas Peronistas (Peronist Armed Forces) a Peronist organization that in 1973 merged with the militant Montoneros. He was an important official, working on the press distribution for the movement, and intelligence. His first nom de guerre was "Esteban", and later he was known as "El Capitán", "Profesor Neurus" or just "Neurus".

Differences with Montoneros
In 1974 Walsh began to have differences with the Montoneros, after Mario Firmenich made the surprise decision to take the group underground. Towards the end of 1975, several officials, including Walsh, began to promulgate documents recommending that the Montoneros "re-join the people, separate organizationally into watertight and independent combat cells, distribute money amongst them and try to organize a massive resistance, based more on popular involvement than on  foquista type operations.

In the letter he wrote to the leadership of the organization, he wrote:

His role as part of the Montoneros Intelligence

Rodolfo Walsh reportedly played a key role in gathering important information for the Montoneros' Military Secretariat Department of Information and Intelligence. As a second officer of Montonero intelligence, Rodolfo Walsh had reportedly informed the Montoneros leadership in January 1976 that the Argentine military commanders were planning a takeover in March. According to the book Political Violence and Trauma in Argentina, the son of retired Lieutenant-General Julio Alsogaray, Juan Carlos Alsogaray, had opened his father's safe, copied a draft of "Battle Order 24 March", and passed it on to Walsh. Juan Carlos ("El Hippie") Alsogaray, a Montoneros officer secretly working for Walsh, was killed in a fierce confrontation with Argentine paratroopers on 13 February 1976, when his 65-strong Montoneros Jungle Company was ambushed near the town of Cadillal in Tucuman province.

About this, Walsh wrote in a private letter on December 29, 1976:

It has been suggested by M. E. Andersen that Montoneros could have been nurtured by the military in order to justify their coup. According to this version, shortly after the military coup on 23 March 1976, Walsh would have written that the Montoneros welcomed the coup "as a victory in the making" and that the coup "will culminate in the seizure of power by the revolutionary left." Private Sergio Tarnopolsky serving in the Argentine Marine Corps in 1976, passed on valuable information to Walsh regarding the tortures and killings of left-wing guerrillas taking place in ESMA. He was later made to disappear along with his father Hugo and mother Blanca and sister Betina and his wife Laura De Luca in revenge for a bomb that he planted in the detention center that failed to explode.

ANCLA
In 1976, in response to censorship imposed by the military dictatorship, Walsh created ANCLA, (Clandestine News Agency), and the "Information Chain", a system of hand-to-hand information distribution whose leaflets stated in the heading:

The death of his daughter Victoria and of his friend Urondo
On September 29, 1976, Walsh's daughter María Victoria (nom de guerre "Hilda", or "Vicki" to family and friends), second officer of the organization Montoneros, died in a confrontation with the army, the day after her 26th birthday, in an incident known as "The Battle of Corro Street". Realizing she was surrounded with no chance of escape on the terrace of her house, she and Alberto Molina, the last survivor, raised their arms and after a brief speech that ended with the phrase "You're not killing us, we're choosing to die", both Alberto and Vicki shot themselves in the temple. In December of that year, Walsh published a message in which he described the events, entitled Letter to My Friends (Carta a mis amigos).

That same year in Mendoza, his friend Paco Urondo who fought in the Montoneros, was murdered by Juan Agustín Oyarzábal Navarro, Eduardo Smahá Borzuk ("Ruso"), Alberto Rodríguez Vázquez (“Pájaro Loco”), and Celustiano Lucero (“Mono”). They were convicted in 2011 and received the maximum sentence. Dardo Migno received 12 years in prison.
From the trial it was determined that Urondo did not commit suicide by swallowing a cyanide pill, but rather died from a skull fracture caused by a blow to the head with a gun handle that policeman Celustiano Lucero administered. Lucero confessed to this act during the defense.

His other daughter, Patricia, is currently an Argentine political leader.

Death
On March 25, 1977, only minutes after publishing (by sending it through mail) his Open Letter from a Writer to the Military Junta (Carta Abierta de un Escritor a la Junta Militar), Rodolfo Walsh was on foot near the crossroads of San Juan and Entre Ríos Avenues, in Buenos Aires, (according to the investigator Natalia Vinelli: "after mailing the first copies [of the letter] at the mailbox in Plaza Constitución"), when a group of soldiers from the Escuela de Mecánica de la Armada (Navy School of Mechanics) ordered him to surrender. Walsh resisted with a small pistol he carried, apparently firing first. He wounded one of the soldiers, and was then mortally wounded by machine-gun fire.

During the first presidency of Cristina Fernandez de Kirchner (2007-2011), the members of the aforementioned group were judged for the kidnapping and murder of the writer. The accused, who according to the Chamber "passed the kidnapped in an automobile" to identify Walsh, also know who betrayed him by passing on the details of the appointment that the writer had in the location where he was kidnapped. Ricardo Coquet, a survivor who testified before federal judge, Sergio Torres, stated that one of the accused, ex-officer Weber, told him proudly "We took Walsh down. The son of a bitch took cover behind a tree, and defended himself with a .22. We hailed him with bullets and he didn't go down, the son of a bitch." According to declarations by detainees who survived, his body was later shown to them in the ESMA (Navy School of Mechanics). In 2011 a dozen members of the task force had finally been convicted of crimes against humanity, with two more facing further charges in the ongoing “mega-trial” of ex-ESMA personnel.

Judicial process
On October 26, 2005, 12 military personnel were arrested, amongst whom were the ex-naval officer Juan Carlos Rolón, in relation to the death of Rodolfo Walsh.

On December 17, 2007, federal judge Sergio Torres mounted a trial on the charge of "illegitimate deprivation of liberty doubly aggravated for having been committed with abuse of office and with the corresponding aggravation of having been perpetrated with violence and threats" and "robbery aggravated for having been committed in public and in a group" of Alfredo Astiz, Jorge "Tigre" Acosta, Pablo García Velasco, Jorge Radice, Juan Carlos Rolón, Antonio Pernías, Julio César Coronel, Ernesto Frimon Weber and Carlos Orlando Generoso.

In 2015 the Supreme Court ratified the 2011 sentences and convictions of all the accused.

Legacy 
Rodolfo Walsh's personality has been studied in literary circles as a paradigmatic example of the tensions between the intellectual and the political, or between the writer and the committed revolutionary. Walsh however, thought of himself as a revolutionary more than a writer, and stated so publicly.

His Carta Abierta a La Junta Militar was brought to cinema through the short film The AAA are the three services (Las AAA son las tres armas), produced by the group Base Cinema (Cine de La Base), led by the disappeared director Raymundo Gleyzer.

Narrative Style

Works
 Diez Cuentos Policiales (1953)
 Variaciones en Rojo (1953)
 Antología del Cuento Extraño (1956)
 Operación Masacre (1957)
 La Granada (1965, teatro)
 La Batalla (1965, teatro)
 Los Oficios Terrestres (1965)
 Un Kilo de Oro (1967)
 ¿Quién Mató a Rosendo? (1969)
 Un Oscuro Día de Justicia (1973)
 El Caso Satanovsky (1973)
 Los Oficios Terrestres (1986)
 Cuento para Tahúres y Otros Relatos Policiales (1987)
 Ese Hombre y Otros Papeles Personales (1995)

Further reading
 Michael McCaughan: True Crime: Rodolfo Walsh and the Role of the Intellectual in Latin American Politics, Latin America Bureau 2000, 
 Gabriel García Márquez: Rodolfo Walsh, el hombre que se adelantó a la CIA (the man who was ahead of the CIA), in Revista Alternativa n. 124, Bogotá, 1974. Collected in Por la libre, Obra periodística 4 (1974–1995)

References

External links
 Entry in Dictionary of Irish Latin American Biography
  Rodolfo Walsh
  Biography
  Rodolfo Walsh Biography
  El Caso Walsh
 
  Open Letter to the Military Junta
  'Rodolfo Walsh' Investigation group
  Rodolfo Walsh reading part of: Operación masacre, El caso Satanowsky y "Esa mujer"
 Rodolfo Walsh and the Struggle for Argentina by Stephen Phelan for Boston Review, October 28, 2013

Argentine male writers
Assassinated Argentine journalists
Male journalists
Investigative journalists
Montoneros
People killed in the Dirty War
Deaths by firearm in Argentina
Argentine people of Irish descent
People from Río Negro Province
1927 births
1977 deaths
20th-century journalists